The Dancing Assemblies of Philadelphia, and dancing assemblies in general, consisted of subscribers who paid a fee to pay for facilities and refreshments in order to meet on scheduled nights to dance, play cards, and particularly, discuss politics.

Such assemblies took place in several countries, such as England and its colonies, but they became especially prevalent in the New World colonies. Philadelphia formed one of the first such forms of social gathering in 1749. The Philadelphia Dancing Assembly was regularly attended by Benjamin Franklin, George Washington, and other prominent figures of the time.

References

Events in Philadelphia
History of Philadelphia
Politics of Philadelphia
Province of Pennsylvania